Pacific Place is an upscale shopping center in downtown Seattle, Washington, United States. It has five floors, the uppermost of which features an 11-screen AMC Theatre (formerly General Cinema) and various restaurants. Pacific Place also features a skybridge that connects it to Seattle's Nordstrom flagship. During the Christmas season, there is an artificial snow display every night at 6 p.m. in the atrium.

On July 14, 2014, Pacific Place was sold for $271 million to Madison Marquette, a Washington, D.C.-based commercial real estate company. In September 2016, Madison Marquette completed the purchase of the Pacific Place parking garage from the city of Seattle for $87 million. A redevelopment of the mall was announced in March 2017 to expand space for shops and remodel the common areas. After over two years of redevelopment, Pacific Placed reopened in June 2020. Throughout 2021, small independent shops and art non-profits have utilized vacancy spaces for business and artistic activities.

Scandal 
In a 1998 article by Mark Worth, the Seattle Weekly revealed that consultants linked to Pacific Place developer Jeff Rhodes had secured a $47 million low-interest loan to help build a for-profit parking garage beneath the mall. The loan was obtained through the Washington State Housing Finance Commission, a government agency whose mission is to support low-income housing and other needy projects. The parking garage also served a Nordstrom store across the street.

References

External links
Pacific Place website
Story of Pacific Place

Shopping malls in Seattle
Shopping malls established in 1998
NBBJ buildings
1998 establishments in Washington (state)
Downtown Seattle